Giuseppe Macchiarella from the Politecnico di Milano, Milano, Italy was named Fellow of the Institute of Electrical and Electronics Engineers (IEEE) in 2015 for contributions to the synthesis of microwave filters and multiplexers.

References

Fellow Members of the IEEE
Living people
Year of birth missing (living people)
Place of birth missing (living people)